Space Force is a science fiction television pilot starring Fred Willard for the NBC television network. It aired as a one-off on April 28, 1978, but the series was not picked up. The pilot set up a scenario not unlike The Phil Silvers Show in which opportunistic Captain Thomas Woods (Willard) leads his starcraft crew in schemes under the nose of the overbearing Captain Leon Stoner and dotty station Commander Irving Hinkley (William Phipps). Actor Phipps stated the show was originally titled Fort Leo (after the name of the ship), and claimed it was passed over because of the short-lived series Buck Henry produced, Quark, which was cancelled even before Space Force was aired.

Plot synopsis
Aboard space station Fort Leo Captain Thomas Woods (Willard) arranged a carnival to raise money for a children's hospital on planet Triton by selling unauthorized military equipment to civilians and joyrides on their starcraft. Meanwhile, Captain Leon Stoner presses station Commander Irving Hinkley to go to war with the planet Algon over the capture of a spy.

Cast
 William Phipps as Commander Irving Hinkley
 Fred Willard as Captain Thomas Woods
 Larry Block as Private Arnold Fleck
 Jim Boyd as Captain Leon Stoner
 Hilly Hicks as Captain Robert Milford
 Maureen Mooney as Sergeant Eve Bailey
 Joseph G. Medalis as Lieutenant Kabar
 Richard Paul as D.O.R.C. (voice)
 Billy Braver as Berkovitz
 Deborah Harmon as Ship's Crier
 Zitto Kazann as War Minister Dalan
 Patricia Noble as Merivac (voice)

Legacy
Fred Willard reprised his role from the pilot in a comedy sketch for Jimmy Kimmel Live! in 2018 and 2019. First, as interviewed by Kimmel after the announcement of the formation of the United States Space Force, and again in response to a media soundbite from Senator Ted Cruz about a need for the U.S. Space Force to battle "space pirates" in which Willard appears in a trailer for "Space Force 2 - Attack of the Space Pirates," a sequel to the failed 1978 series. Willard portrayed an unrelated character for the 2020 Netflix series Space Force.

References

External links
 

1978 films
1978 television films
1970s science fiction films
Television films as pilots
Television pilots not picked up as a series
American science fiction television films
Films directed by Peter Baldwin (director)
1970s American films